Walter König (born 9 June 1944) is an Austrian ice hockey player. He competed in the men's tournament at the 1968 Winter Olympics.

References

External links
 

1944 births
Living people
Ice hockey players at the 1968 Winter Olympics
Olympic ice hockey players of Austria
Sportspeople from Klagenfurt